MMP-8 may refer to:
 Microbial collagenase, an enzyme
 Neutrophil collagenase, an enzyme